The Prêmio Extra de Televisão de melhor telenovela (English: Extra Television Awards for Best Telenovela) is a category of the Prêmio Extra de Televisão, awarded to the best telenovela on Brazilian television.

Winner

1998–2008 
 1998 – Torre de Babel, by Silvio de Abreu
 1999 – Terra Nostra, by Benedito Ruy Barbosa
 2000 – Laços de Família, by Manoel Carlos
 2001 – Presença de Anita, by Manoel Carlos
 2002 – O Clone, by Glória Perez
 2003 – Mulheres Apaixonadas, by Manoel Carlos
 2004 – Celebridade, by Gilberto Braga
 2005 – América, by Glória Perez
 2006 – Páginas da Vida, by Manoel Carlos
 2007 – Paraíso Tropical, by Gilberto Braga and Ricardo Linhares
 2008 – A Favorita, by João Emanuel Carneiro

2009–present 
 2009 – Caminho das Índias, by Glória Perez
 Bela, a Feia, by Gisele Joras
 Caras & Bocas, by Walcyr Carrasco
 Paraíso, by Edmara Barbosa
 Poder Paralelo, by Lauro César Muniz
 Três Irmãs, by Antônio Calmon
 2010 – Passione, by Sílvio de Abreu
 Ti Ti Ti, by Maria Adelaide Amaral
 Viver a Vida, by Manoel Carlos
 Escrito nas Estrelas, by Elizabeth Jhin
 Cama de Gato, by Duca Rachid and Thelma Guedes
 Ribeirão do Tempo, by Marcílio Moraes
 2011 – Cordel Encantado, by Duca Rachid and Thelma Guedes
 Araguaia, by Walther Negrão
 Insensato Coração, by Gilberto Braga and Ricardo Linhares
 Morde & Assopra, by Walcyr Carrasco
 O Astro, by Alcides Nogueira and Geraldo Carneiro
 Rebelde, by Margareth Boury
 2012 – Avenida Brasil, by João Emanuel Carneiro
 Amor Eterno Amor, by Elizabeth Jhin
 A Vida da Gente, by Lícia Manzo
 Cheias de Charme, by Filipe Miguez and Izabel de Oliveira
 Fina Estampa, by Aguinaldo Silva
 Gabriela, by Walcyr Carrasco
 2013 – Amor à Vida, by Walcyr Carrasco
 Flor do Caribe, by Walther Negrão
 Lado a Lado, by João Ximenes Braga and Claudia Lage
 Salve Jorge, by Glória Perez
 Sangue Bom, by Maria Adelaide Amaral and Vincent Villari
 Saramandaia, by Ricardo Linhares
 2014 – Império, by Aguinaldo Silva
 Boogie Oogie, by Rui Vilhena
 Em Família, by Manoel Carlos
 Joia Rara, by Duca Rachid and Thelma Guedes
 Meu Pedacinho de Chão, by Benedito Ruy Barbosa
 O Rebu, by George Moura and Sérgio Goldenberg
 2015 – Verdades Secretas, by Walcyr Carrasco
 Além do Tempo, by Elizabeth Jhin
 A Regra do Jogo, by João Emanuel Carneiro
 Babilônia, by Gilberto Braga, Ricardo Linhares and João Ximenes Braga
 Os Dez Mandamentos, by Vívian de Oliveira
 Sete Vidas, by Lícia Manzo
 2016 – Êta Mundo Bom!, by Walcyr Carrasco
 Escrava Mãe, by Gustavo Reiz
 Haja Coração, by Daniel Ortiz
 Liberdade, Liberdade, by Mário Teixeira
 Totalmente Demais, by Rosane Svartman and Paulo Halm
 Velho Chico, by Benedito Ruy Barbosa and Edmara Barbosa

See also
Latin American television awards

References

External links 
Official website

Soap opera awards
Brazilian television awards
Latin American television awards
Prêmio Extra de Televisão
1998 establishments in Brazil